Harison may refer to:

Harison's Yellow, rose cultivar
Francis Harison (died 1740), American lawyer and politician
Richard Harison (1747-1829), American lawyer and politician
Christopher Harison (1825-1897), British military officer and forestry official
Harison (footballer) (born 1980), full name Harison da Silva Nery, Brazilian footballer

See also
Harrison (disambiguation)